Stoke EfW is a large incineration plant in the Sideway area of Stoke-on-Trent, England. It burns municipal waste and in the process produces electricity for the National Grid.

It was originally built in 1989 and is operated by Hanford Waste Services Ltd. The original plant was found to release 300 times the standard level of dioxins, so was replaced with a new facility, opening in October 1998. The plant is dominated by a 76-metre-tall chimney stack and has a total installed generating capacity of 15.4 megawatts.

References

External links

REA projects:Stoke Incinerator

Waste power stations in England